The Cyproniscidae are a family of marine isopod crustaceans in the suborder Cymothoida. The original description was made by Bonnier in 1900. Members of this family are parasitic on other isopods.

The family contains these genera and species:
Cyproniscus Kossmann, 1884
Cyproniscus crossophori Stebbing, 1901
Cyproniscus cypridinae (G.O. Sars, 1883)
Cyproniscus decemspinosus Menzies & George, 1972
Cyproniscus octospinosus Menzies & George, 1972
Cyproniscus peruvicus Menzies & George, 1972
Onisocryptus Schultz, 1977
Onisocryptus kurilensis Rybakov, 1998
Onisocryptus ovalis (Shiino, 1942)
Onisocryptus sagittus Schultz, 1977

References

Cymothoida
Crustacean families